John T. Russell (September 22, 1931 – March 25, 2016) was an American politician who served as a Missouri state representative from 1962 until 1974 and a Missouri state senator from 1976 until 2000.

Born in Lebanon, Missouri, Russell previously served in the United States Air Force and as Minority Floor Leader in the Missouri Senate.

References

1931 births
2016 deaths
People from Lebanon, Missouri
Baptists from Missouri
Republican Party members of the Missouri House of Representatives
Republican Party Missouri state senators